Extra Special! is a compilation album by Peggy Lee recorded between 1960 and 1966, with arrangers including (Quincy Jones, Ralph Carmichael, Bill Holman, and Johnny Mandel). Three songs that Lee co-wrote are featured.

Track listing
"Hey, Look Me Over" (Cy Coleman, Carolyn Leigh) - 1:55
"When He Makes Music" (Jack Segal, Marvin Fisher) - 2:50
"Walking Happy" (Jimmy Van Heusen, Sammy Cahn) - 2:34
"Oh! You Crazy Moon" (Van Heusen, Johnny Burke) - 2:47
"So What's New?" (Peggy Lee, John Pisano) - 2:16
"Call Me Darling" (Dorothy Dick, Mort Fryberg, Rolf Marbet, Bert Reisfeld) - 2:37
"A Bucket of Tears" (Winfield Scott, Dorothy Goodman) - 2:17
"The Shining Sea" (Lee, Johnny Mandel) - 2:47
"A Doodlin' Song (Doop Doo-De Oop)" (Coleman, Leigh) - 2:06
"Amazing" (Norman Gimbel, Emil Stern) - 2:35
"I'm Gonna Go Fishin'" (Lee, Duke Ellington) - 2:09

References

Peggy Lee albums
Albums produced by Dave Cavanaugh
1967 compilation albums
Capitol Records compilation albums